Orest Tereshchuk (born 18 August 1981) is a former professional tennis player from Ukraine.

Career
Tereshchuk began playing Davis Cup tennis for the Ukrainian national team in 1999. His last appearance in 2007 was his 18th tie for Ukraine, leveling Andrei Medvedev's record. He finished with a 22/10 career record, second only to Medvedev.

On the ATP Tour he made doubles appearances in the 2006 Kremlin Cup (partnering Alexey Kedryuk) and the 2007 St. Petersburg Open (partnering Sergiy Stakhovsky) but was unable to progress past the opening round in either. He was however highly successful on the ATP Challenger circuit, winning 11 doubles titles. As a singles player, he had the best win of his career in a Challenger tournament at Dnipropetrovsk in 2003, when he defeated Karol Beck, then ranked 66th in the world.

The Ukrainian teamed up with Lars Burgsmüller at the 2007 Wimbledon Championships and after making it through qualifying they faced the Belgian pairing of Olivier Rochus and Kristof Vliegen in the first round. Tereschchuk and Burgsmüller lost the match in straight sets.

Challenger titles

Doubles: (11)

References

1981 births
Living people
Ukrainian male tennis players
Sportspeople from Lviv